Amy Phillips (born September 30, 1973) is an American professional racing cyclist. She rides for the Pepper Palace p/b The Happy Tooth team.

See also
 List of 2015 UCI Women's Teams and riders

References

External links
 

1973 births
Living people
American female cyclists
Place of birth missing (living people)
21st-century American women